Webberville is a village in Travis County, Texas (USA). Its population was 392, according to a 2010 census estimate.

Comprising settlements dating back to 1827, Webber's Prairie was formally established by retired physician John Ferdinand Webber in 1839. Webber's Prairie was renamed Webberville in 1853, and was incorporated as a Village in February 2003.

In December 2011, the new Webberville Solar Farm began generating solar energy with Gemini Solar Development Company for Austin Energy. In 2009, the two companies signed a 25-year contract. The 30 megawatt solar farm is expected to generate 1.4 billion kWh of electricity over 25 years.

Geography

Webberville is located at  (30.226071, –97.499593).

Demographics

Education
The Del Valle Independent School District serves area students. Joseph Gilbert Elementary School serves the community. Students are also zoned to Dailey Middle School, and Del Valle High School.

References

External links
 Village of Webberville
 Webberville Solar Farm
 

Villages in Travis County, Texas
Villages in Texas
Greater Austin
Populated places established in 1827
1827 establishments in Texas